Raul Soyud (born January 14, 1991) is a Filipino professional basketball player for the Phoenix Super LPG Fuel Masters of the Philippine Basketball Association (PBA). He played college basketball for the UP Fighting Maroons of the University Athletic Association of the Philippines (UAAP).

Professional career
He was drafted 31st overall by the Blackwater Elite during the 2014 PBA draft but never played for the team.

He joined the NLEX Road Warriors in 2015, initially playing in limited games. He became a regular in the rotation of the team when Yeng Guiao became the team's head coach.

On September 19, 2022, Soyud was traded to the TNT Tropang Giga in a three-team trade involving TNT, NLEX, and Blackwater Bossing.

On January 18, 2023, Soyud was traded to the Phoenix Super LPG Fuel Masters in a three-team trade involving Phoenix, TNT, and NLEX Road Warriors.

PBA career statistics

As of the end of 2021 season

Season-by-season averages

|-
| align=left | 
| align=left | NLEX
| 2 || 3.1 || .000 || – || – || .5 || .0 || .0 || .0 || .0
|-
| align=left | 
| align=left | NLEX
| 4 || 5.5 || .333 || .000 || 1.000 || .8 || .0 || .0 || .0 || 1.5
|-
| align=left | 
| align=left | NLEX
| 31 || 12.1 || .472 || .341 || .656 || 3.9 || .4 || .2 || .5 || 4.9
|-
| align=left | 
| align=left | NLEX
| 32 || 12.4 || .569 || .385 || .610 || 3.7 || .3 || .1 || .3 || 5.0
|-
| align=left | 
| align=left | NLEX
| 32 || 10.3 || .545 || .346 || .679 || 3.4 || .5 || .2 || .2 || 4.3
|-
| align=left | 
| align=left | NLEX
| 11 || 18.5 || .738 || .364 || .615 || 6.8 || 1.1 || .1 || .1 || 10.0
|-
| align=left | 
| align=left | NLEX
| 22 || 17.7 || .596 || .333 || .625 || 6.0 || .5 || .4 || .4 || 6.0
|-class=sortbottom
| align=center colspan=2 | Career
| 134 || 12.9 || .560 || .350 || .641 || 4.2 || .5 || .2 || .3 || 5.2

References

External links
PBA.ph profile
Inquirer.net profile

1991 births
Living people
Basketball players from Negros Occidental
Blackwater Bossing draft picks
Centers (basketball)
Filipino men's basketball players
NLEX Road Warriors players
Phoenix Super LPG Fuel Masters players
TNT Tropang Giga players
UP Fighting Maroons basketball players